Eintracht Frankfurt competed in the 2nd Bundesliga and in the DFB Pokal in the 2004–05 season.

Results

Legend

Friendlies

Bundesliga

League table

Results summary

Results by round

Matches

DFB-Pokal

Indoor soccer tournaments

Hessen Cup

Cup der Öffentlichen Versicherungen

Players

First-team squad
Squad at end of season

Left club during season

Eintracht Frankfurt II

Statistics

Appearances and goals

|}

Transfers

Transferred in

Transferred out

Notes

Sources

 Official English Eintracht website 
 Eintracht-Archiv.de
 2004–05 Eintracht Frankfurt season at Fussballdaten.de 

2004-05
German football clubs 2004–05 season